Entrevías is a neighbourhood of Madrid belonging to  the district of Puente de Vallecas. As of 2019 it was the poorest neighborhood in the municipality.

According to the National Institute of Statistics, the population of Entrevías in 2006 was 37,790.

The Spanish television series Entrevías, first airing on Telecinco and distributed as Wrong Side of the Tracks on  Netflix in English markets, is set in a fictionalized version of the neighborhood.

References

Wards of Madrid
Puente de Vallecas